Gol Gol-e Sofla (also Romanized as Gol Gol-e Soflá and Golgol-e Soflá; also known as Sīrāneh) is a village in Gachi Rural District, Gachi District, Malekshahi County, Ilam Province, Iran. At the 2006 census, its population was 140, in 35 families. The village is populated by Kurds.

References 

Populated places in Malekshahi County
Kurdish settlements in Ilam Province